Pandanus elatus is a dioecious tropical plant in the screwpine genus.  It is endemic to Christmas Island, an Australian territory in the north-eastern Indian Ocean.  Its specific epithet comes from the Latin elatus (tall), in reference to its growth habit.

Description
Pandanus elatus is an erect tree, with basal prop roots, that grows to 20 m in height.  Its leaves grow to 3 m long and 100 mm wide, dark green and with marginal prickles.  The plants do not form the densely tangled thickets that characterise P. christmatensis.

Distribution and habitat
Found only on Christmas Island, the tree is found on deeper soils in the rainforest, sometimes in small groves.

Taxonomy
The tree is closely related to P. leram Jones, of the Andaman and Nicobar Islands and the southern coasts of Sumatra and western Java.

References

Notes

Sources
 
 

elatus
Endemic flora of Christmas Island
Plants described in 1906
Taxa named by Henry Nicholas Ridley